Parliamentary elections were held in Ceylon between 23 August and 20 September 1947. They were the first elections overseen and administered by the newly formed Department of Parliamentary Elections.

Background
This is considered the first national election held in Sri Lanka (then known as Ceylon).  Although it took place before independence was actually granted, it was the first election under the Soulbury Constitution.

Some of the major figures who had led the independence struggle were found in the right-wing United National Party led by D.S. Senanayake. In opposition were the Trotskyist Lanka Sama Samaja Party and Bolshevik Leninist Party of India, the Communist Party of Ceylon, the Ceylon Indian Congress and an array of independents.

Results
Senanayake's UNP fell short of a majority, but was able to form a government in coalition with the All Ceylon Tamil Congress, which had taken most of the seats in the Tamil-majority regions of the island.

Sri Lanka obtained full independence as a dominion in 1948. The British nevertheless retained military bases in the country and English remained as the official language along with much of the administrative system put in place by the British along with British officials.

Notes

References

 
 
 
 
 

 
Ceylon
Parliamentary elections in Sri Lanka
August 1947 events in Asia
September 1947 events in Asia
1947 elections in the British Empire
Election and referendum articles with incomplete results